The Edelweiss was an international express train.  For most of its existence, it linked the Netherlands with Switzerland, via Belgium, Luxembourg and France.  Introduced in 1928, it was named after a mountain flower, the Edelweiss (Leontopodium alpinum), which is associated with alpinism and the Alps, and regarded as a symbol of Switzerland.

From its introduction until it was suspended in 1939 upon the outbreak of World War II, the Edelweiss was a luxury train operated by the Compagnie Internationale des Wagons-Lits (CIWL), and ran between Amsterdam CS in Amsterdam, the Netherlands, and Luzern station in Lucerne, Switzerland.

After the war, the Edelweiss was revived, initially as an ordinary express train between Brussels, Belgium, and Basel SBB in Basel, Switzerland.  In 1957, it became one of the first of the first-class-only Trans Europ Express (TEE) trains, with its southern terminus moved from Basel further southeast, to Zürich HB in Zurich, Switzerland.

In 1974, the northern terminus of the Edelweiss was moved south, from Amsterdam to Brussels. On 27 May 1979, the Edelweiss was reclassified as a two-class express, and on 6 April 1980 the train's Basel–Zurich section was dropped.  On 1 June 1997, the route was re-extended from Basel to Zurich, but the Edelweiss was discontinued on 29 May 1999, replaced by the Jean Monnet, which ran on the former train's schedule between Brussels and Strasbourg only, not south of Strasbourg.

See also

 History of rail transport in Belgium
 History of rail transport in Luxembourg
 History of rail transport in France
 History of rail transport in Switzerland
 List of named passenger trains of Europe

References

Notes

Bibliography
 
 
 

International named passenger trains
Named passenger trains of the Netherlands
Named passenger trains of Belgium
Named passenger trains of Luxembourg
Named passenger trains of France
Named passenger trains of Switzerland
Trans Europ Express
Railway services introduced in 1928
Railway services discontinued in 1999